Cardiff City F.C. (commonly referred to as just Cardiff City) is a professional association football club based in Cardiff, Wales.

Cardiff City may also refer to:
 Cardiff, the capital of and most-populated city in Wales
 Cardiff city centre, centre and central business district of Cardiff
 Cardiff City Council, governing body and county council of Cardiff
 Cardiff City F.C. (women), women's football club based in Cardiff and women's section of Cardiff City F.C.
 Cardiff City Ladies F.C., Welsh women's association football club based in Cardiff with no relation to Cardiff City F.C.
 Cardiff City Stadium, home stadium of Cardiff City and the Wales national football team

See also
 Cardiff (disambiguation)